The Sri Damansara Barat MRT station is a mass rapid transit (MRT) station in the suburb of Bandar Sri Damansara in Sungai Buloh, Selangor, Malaysia. It is one of the stations on the MRT Putrajaya line.

The station opened on 16 June 2022 under Phase One operations of the line.

Location 
The station is located along Kepong-Kuala Selangor Highway , along the banks of the Sungai Buloh River.

Station features 

 Elevated station with island platform.
 Park & ride

References

External links

 Sri Damansara West MRT Station | mrt.com.my
 Klang Valley Mass Rapid Transit website
 MRT Hawk-Eye View

Rapid transit stations in Selangor
Sungai Buloh-Serdang-Putrajaya Line
Railway stations opened in 2022